Philippe Naillet (born 14 August 1960 in Saint-Denis, Reunion) is a French politician. A member of the Socialist Party and a municipal councillor of Saint-Denis, he was the substitute for Ericka Bareigts, the successful candidate for Réunion's 1st constituency in the 2012 election.  He replaced Bareigts when she was appointed Minister of Overseas France in 2016 and served as deputy until the 2017 election.

Biography

Naillet studied at the University of Reunion. He was then a Life Insurance Inspector for AG2R La Mondiale.

References

External links
 His page on the site of the National Assembly

1960 births
Living people
Deputies of the 14th National Assembly of the French Fifth Republic
Deputies of the 15th National Assembly of the French Fifth Republic
People from Saint-Denis, Réunion
Socialist Party (France) politicians
Members of Parliament for Réunion
Deputies of the 16th National Assembly of the French Fifth Republic